Novoaidar Raion was a raion (district) in Luhansk Oblast in eastern Ukraine. The administrative center of the raion was the urban-type settlement of Novoaidar. The raion was abolished on 18 July 2020 as part of the administrative reform of Ukraine, which reduced the number of raions of Luhansk Oblast to eight, of which only four were controlled by the government. The last estimate of the raion population was

History 
Starting mid-April 2014 pro-Russian separatists captured several towns and raions in Luhansk Oblast; Ukrainian forces reportedly removed the separatists from the last village of Novoaidar Raion under separatist control, Krymsky, on 20 October 2014.

To facilitate the governance of Luhansk Oblast during the War in Donbass, the Verkhovna Rada on 7 October 2014 made some changes in the administrative divisions, so that the localities in the government-controlled areas were grouped into districts. In particular, the town of Shchastia was transferred from Luhansk Municipality to Novoaidar Raion. Some areas were transferred to the raion from Slovianoserbsk Raion.

Demographics 
As of the 2001 Ukrainian census:

Ethnicity
 Ukrainians: 56.1%
 Russians: 42.7%
 Belarusians: 0.4%

References

Former raions of Luhansk Oblast
1923 establishments in Ukraine
Ukrainian raions abolished during the 2020 administrative reform